Tomáš Kubík (born 18 March 1992) is a Slovak football player who currently plays for SC Bad Sauerbrunn.

References
Tomáš Kubík: Za to, čo mi dlhuje VSS, by som si mohol kúpiť byt 
Kubík: Spišská Nová Ves je môj domov, skôr či neskôr sa vrátim

External links
Tomáš Kubík at ÖFB

1992 births
Living people
Slovak footballers
Slovak expatriate footballers
Association football forwards
FC VSS Košice players
MŠK Rimavská Sobota players
FK Spišská Nová Ves players
Slovak Super Liga players
Sportspeople from Spišská Nová Ves
Slovak expatriate sportspeople in Austria
Expatriate footballers in Austria